Jamshid Zokirov (sometimes spelled Dzhamshid Zakirov in English) (July 11, 1948 – April 7, 2012) was one of the most highly acclaimed Uzbek film and theater actors. He became a Meritorious Artist of Uzbekistan in 1995. Jamshid Zokirov died of cancer on April 7, 2012, in Tashkent.

Family and personal life 
Jamshid Zokirov's spouse, Gavhar Zokirova, is a theater actress. The Zokirovs performed together in Uzbek theaters for many years. Jamshid Zokirov was a younger brother of Botir Zokirov, an influential Uzbek singer and cultural figure, and an older brother of Farrukh Zokirov, the frontman of the famous Uzbek band Yalla.

Jamshid Zokirov died of cancer on April 7, 2012, in Tashkent. He had been fighting the disease for about a year and had sought treatment abroad. His wife remained by his side during his time of illness. Jamshid Zokirov was buried alongside his father Karim Zokirov and brother Botir Zokirov at Chigʻatoy Cemetery in Tashkent.

Filmography 
 Улица тринадцати тополей (The Street of Thirteen Poplars) (1969)
 Kelinlar qoʻzgʻoloni (Russian: Бунт невесток) (The Rebellion of the Brides) (1984)
 Объятие мечты (The Embrace of a Dream) (1986)
 Pushaymon (Russian: Горечь падения) (Regret) (1987)
 Бархан (Sand Dune) (1989)
 Temir xotin (Russian: Чудо-женщина) (The Iron Woman) (1990)
 Счастье мое, ты оплачено кровью (My Happiness, Paid with Blood) (1993)
 Shaytanat (2000) (TV series)
 Платина (Platinum) (2007) (TV series) (not credited in the film)
 След саламандры (The Salamander Trail) (2009)
 Suv yoqalab (Along the Water) (2009)
 Высоцкий. Спасибо, что живой (Vysotsky. Thank You For Being Alive) (2011)

References

External links

1948 births
2012 deaths
Actors from Tashkent
Soviet male stage actors
Uzbekistani male stage actors
Soviet male film actors
Uzbekistani male film actors
20th-century Uzbekistani male actors
21st-century Uzbekistani male actors